Ilse de Ruysscher (born 13 July 1962) is a Belgian former professional tennis player.

de Ruysscher has career-high WTA rankings of 308 in singles, achieved on 15 February 1988, and 278 in doubles, set on 15 February 1988. Playing for Belgium at the Fed Cup, de Ruysscher has accumulated a win–loss record of 4–3.

ITF finals

Singles: 2 (0–2)

Doubles: 1 (0–1)

References

External links
 
 

1962 births
Living people
Belgian female tennis players
20th-century Belgian women